Kyle Bay is a suburb in southern Sydney, in the state of New South Wales, Australia.  Kyle Bay is 19 kilometres south of the Sydney central business district, in the local government area of the Georges River Council and is part of the St George area. 

Kyle Bay takes its name from the bay that sits on the northern shore of the Georges River. It is a tiny, affluent, picturesque suburb around this bay and Harness Cask Point.  Kyle Bay is surrounded by the suburbs of Blakehurst, South Hurstville and Connells Point. Kangaroo Point sits on the opposite bank of the Georges River. It is 7 km west of Botany Bay and 12 km north-west of the Cronulla surfing beaches. This leafy suburb is graced with scenic riverside parks and reserves including Merriman Reserve and Donnelly Reserve. Kyle Bay and Harness Cask Point are natural formations.

History 
Kyle Bay was named after local shipbuilder Robert Kyle (or Coile).  The land around Kyle Bay was originally granted by the Crown to Robert Kyle and James Merriman on 9 November 1853. Kyle Parade and Merriman Street are named in their honour.  Legacy House is a historic estate on the eastern shore of Kyle Bay. It was bequest to children and first operated from 1948 to 1983 as a convalescent home for children. It was then taken over by Legacy as a home for the children of servicemen/women who have either lost their parents or whose parents were unable to care for them.

Commercial area 
A small group of shops is located on Kyle Parade, on the corner of Merriman Street. These shops include Bardalla Business Forms, CHEVEUX Hair and Beauty Artistry, the Peacock Trattoria and Bar and the Cup and Cook. Blakehurst Bowling Club sits on the southern shore of Kyle Bay, beside Merriman Reserve. Zippo's restaurant is located at the Kyle Bay Bowling Club.
In August 2016, Zippo's Restaurant closed its doors. The Club, which has changed its name to "The Kyle Bay", was refurbished in 2016. The exterior brickwork was painted white and a cafe/restaurant area was added to the back of the building. It re-opened in January, 2017.

Population
English was stated as the only language spoken at home by 61.6% of residents and the most common other languages spoken were Greek 8.7%, Cantonese 7.8%, and Mandarin 4.4%. The most common responses for religious affiliation were Catholic 25.7%, Orthodox 21.5%, No Religion 17.2%, Anglican 10.8%.

References 

Suburbs of Sydney
Bays of New South Wales
Georges River Council